Wat Kalayanamitr Varamahavihara is a Buddhist temple (wat) in Bangkok, Thailand. The temple is located in Wat Kanlaya sub-district, on the Thonburi bank of the Chao Phraya River.  The temple was established in 1825 by Chaophraya Nikonbodin (born To), a wealthy Thai Chinese trader, who donated the temple to Rama III. Chaophraya Nikonbodin was an ancestor of the Kalayanamitr family, whose descendants include Saprang Kalayanamitr. A poem inscribed in the temple reads:

Wat Kalayanamitr Varamahavihara is one of three family temples of the Kalayanamitr family, along with Wat Rakhang and Wat Chakkrawatdirachawat Woramahawihan. The family name Kalayanamitr derives from a poem inscribed in the temple.

The ordination hall, stands out on the riverbank. It houses a huge Buddha image, Phra Buddha Trai Rattananayok (พระพุทธไตรรัตนนายก), or Luang Pho To (หลวงพ่อโต, Big Buddha) in Thai, known among the ethnic Chinese as Sampokong (ซำปอกง). It is the largest Buddha image in Bangkok, in the same style as the Big Buddha at Wat Phanan Choeng in Phra Nakhon Si Ayutthaya. Therefore making the ordination hall of this temple very large and clearly visible from the river. Both Buddha images are regarded as representatives of both Buddha and Zheng He. Thais and Thais of Chinese descent hold fast to the belief that paying respect to the image brings prosperity and fortune, as well as safe journeys throughout the year.

Gallery

References

Kalayamitr
Thon Buri district
Kalayamitr
1820s in Siam
Thai Theravada Buddhist temples and monasteries
Registered ancient monuments in Bangkok
Buildings and structures on the Chao Phraya River